Bits Studios was a British video game developer. The company has had over 30 titles published over the United States, Europe and Asia on multiple platforms. Bits Studios' parent company, PlayWize sold off all assets and technologies held by the group in 2008, due to poor trading results. The company no longer has any trading operations.

Games developed

Unreleased/Cancelled Games

References

External links

 Bits Studios at MobyGames

Defunct video game companies of the United Kingdom
Video game development companies